Abulug, officially the Municipality of Abulug,  is a 3rd class municipality in the province of , Philippines. According to the 2020 census, it has a population of 34,579 people.

Government

Barangays
Abulug is politically subdivided into 20 barangays. These barangays are headed by elected officials: Barangay Captain, Barangay Council, whose members are called Barangay Councilors. All are elected every three years. In 1957, barrio Colonia was renamed to Libertad.

Climate

Demographics

Economy

Government
Abulug, belonging to the second legislative district of the province of Cagayan, is governed by a mayor designated as its local chief executive and by a municipal council as its legislative body in accordance with the Local Government Code. The mayor, vice mayor, and the councilors are elected directly by the people through an election which is being held every three years.

Elected officials

Healthcare
Apayao-Cagayan Medical Center
Northwestern Cagayan General Hospital (soon to operate) 
Abulug Municipal Hospital
Fungayao Specialty
Butala Ophthalmology Clinic

Banks
 City Savings Bank - Abulug 
 BDO Network Bank - Abulug
 Development Bank of the Philippines - Abulug
 Ficobank - Abulug
 Claveria Agri-based MPC
 Claveria Farmers MPC
 Masisit -Dacal MPC - Abulug
 Cooperative Bank of Cagayan - Abulug

Tourism
 Lucban Bridge - is the seventh longest bridge in the Philippines. The bridge has a length of 825 linear meters, consists of 12 spans with 436.90 linear meters in total length approaches.
 Miraculous Image of Santa Rosa de Lima
 Rio de Abulug/Abulug River
 Sta. Rosa Dragon Fruit Plantations
 Wine Making Industry
 Junction Luna - A place in Abulug where major industries are. They are named because this is the access road towards Apayao, especially Luna, Apayao.

Education
The Schools Division of Cagayan governs the town's public education system. The division office is a field office of the DepEd in Cagayan Valley region. The office governs the public and private elementary and public and private high schools throughout the municipality.

College
 F.L. Vargas College - Abulug Campus

High School
 Abulug School of Fisheries
 Abulug National Rural and Vocational High School
 Libertad National High School
 Divine Word High School - Dana-ili
 F.L. Vargas College - High School Department
 Lyceum of Abulug

Elementary 
 Abulug Central Elementary School
 Alinunu Elementary School
 Bagu Elementary School
 Banguian Elementarry SchoolSchool
 Calog Norte Elementary School
 Calog Sur Elementary School
 Canayun Elementary School
 Dana-ili Elementary School
 Dugo Elementary School
 F. L. Vargas College - Elementary Department
 Guiddam Eementary School
 Libertad Elementary School
 Lucban Elementary School
 Macugay Elementary School
 Muru Elementary School
 Pinaron Elementary School
 Pinili Elementary School
 San Agustin Elementary School
 San Julian Elementary School
 Santa Filomena Elementary School
 Santa Rosa Elementary School
 Santo Tomas Elementary School
 Sawang Elementary School
 Sirit Elementary School
 Tayak Elementary School

Training Centers
 Mire Tutorial Korean Center
 KorPhil Korean Language Training Center, Inc.

Notable personalities

 Maja Ross Andres "Aka Maja" Salvador – a model, singer, dancer, actress and producer regarded as the "Dance Princess". She is from Canayun, Abulug, Cagayan
 Jeth Roy U. Rosario – a professional basketball player of TNT ka Tropa of PBA. He is from Alinunu, Abulug, Cagayan
 Marlan Sabbun-Manguba – a professional dancer; Mrs. World Philippines 2014. She is from Centro, Abulug, Cagayan
 Jamiko Allan "Miko" Manguba – a singer and winner of the boyband show "To the Top" of GMA Network

References

External links
Abulug Cagayan Photo Gallery
 [ Philippine Standard Geographic Code]
Philippine Census Information

Municipalities of Cagayan